Before ceasing operations, Virgin Sun Airlines flew to the following destinations:

Europe
Austria
 Salzburg Airport
France
Toulouse - Toulouse–Blagnac Airport
Greece
 Corfu Airport
Rhodes - Rhodes International Airport, "Diagoras"
Portugal
Faro Airport
Spain
Alicante - Alicante–Elche Miguel Hernández Airport
Arrecife - Lanzarote Airport
Barcelona - Josep Tarradellas Barcelona–El Prat Airport
 Ibiza Airport
Las Palmas - Gran Canaria Airport
 Málaga Airport
 Menorca Airport
 Murcia-San Javier Airport
Palma de Mallorca - Son Sant Joan Airport
 Tenerife South Airport
United Kingdom
London - Gatwick Airport Base
 Manchester Airport Base

External links 
Virgin Sun

References 

Lists of airline destinations

sr:Редовне линије изиЏета